Ay-Yıldız Stadium is a stadium in Karabük, Turkey. It was opened to public in 2014 and have a capacity of 25,000 spectators. This stadium's unique feature is when looked from a bird's eye view, the stadium will have the shape of a crescent moon and a star, as in Turkish flag. It is the new home of Karabük University. The dean of the university stated that Karabukspor is welcome in their stadium.

References

Football venues in Turkey
Sport in Karabük
Sports venues completed in 2014